Parinari oblongifolia is a tree in the family Chrysobalanaceae. The specific epithet  is from the Latin meaning "oblong-leafed".

Description
The smooth bark is grey to pale brown. The flowers are white to bluish.

Distribution and habitat
Parinari oblongifolia grows naturally in Sumatra, Peninsular Malaysia and Borneo. Its habitat is lowland rainforest from sea-level to  altitude.

References

oblongifolia
Trees of Sumatra
Trees of Peninsular Malaysia
Trees of Borneo
Plants described in 1878